Sir Chadwick may refer to:

Albert Chadwick, Australian footballer
Edwin Chadwick, 19th century social reformer
James Chadwick, physicist